The GTW Generation 15 (GTW = "Gelenktriebwagen" or articulated railcar) is a suspended monorail train type operated by Wuppertaler Stadtwerke on the Wuppertal Schwebebahn since 2016.

Technical specifications
Each set consists of three sections. The car bodies are made of welded aluminium.

Interior
The trains have a capacity of 45 seated and 86 standing passengers, and are equipped with a wheelchair ramp and air conditioning.

History
31 sets were ordered in November 2011. The first set was unveiled in Wuppertal on November 14, 2016. On December 18, 2016, the first five trains entered service.

References

External links

 GTW Generation 15 - Mobil NRW website  

Wuppertal Schwebebahn
Electric multiple units of Germany
Stadler Rail multiple units
750 V DC multiple units